Réka Madarász (born 2 July 2000) is a Hungarian badminton player who competes in international level events. She is a bronze medalist at the European U17 Badminton Championships in 2016.

Achievements

European Junior Championships 
Girls' singles

BWF International 
Women's singles

 BWF International Challenge tournament
 BWF International Series tournament
 BWF Future Series tournament

References

2000 births
Living people
Hungarian female badminton players